The  is a Japanese aerial lift line, as well as its operator. The line climbs Mount Nokogiri (Nokogiri-yama) from the outer Tokyo Bay coast in Futtsu, Chiba. It opened in 1962. Nokogiriyama Ropeway Company belongs to Keisei Group.

Outline

Chronicle
on 21 December 1962:The ropeway opened

Stations

Basic data
Distance: 
Vertical interval:

See also
List of aerial lifts in Japan

References

External links
 Nokogiriyama Ropeway official website

Aerial tramways in Japan
1962 establishments in Japan